Oregon-Nashua Township is located in Ogle County, Illinois. As of the 2010 census, its population was 4,909 and it contained 2,382 housing units.

History
Prior to the year 1993, Oregon and Nashua were separate townships, but merged in that year.

Geography

Demographics

References

External links
 US Census
 City-data.com
 Ogle County Official Site

Townships in Ogle County, Illinois
Townships in Illinois
1993 establishments in Illinois